Apartment 255 is a 2001 Ned Kelly Award-winning novel by the Australian author Bunty Avieson.

Plot

'Apartment 255' is the story of two best friends since school - Sarah and Ginny - who are, at the time of the book's telling, adults. Things are depicted as much better for Sarah - who has a boyfriend Tom with whom she shares a stunning inner-city apartment. But things have not worked out so well for Ginny who wanted Tom, and didn't get him. She wants what Sarah has, and moves into an apartment overlooking Sarah and Tom's flat to stalk them.

Awards
 Ned Kelly Awards for Crime Writing, Best First Novel Award, 2002: joint winner

Reviews
 Australian Crime Fiction Database - Apartment 255 by Bunty Avieson

Australian crime novels
2001 Australian novels
Ned Kelly Award-winning works
2001 debut novels
Macmillan Publishers books